Paradise-crows are found in the genus Lycocorax  in the family Paradisaeidae.

It contains the following species:
 Halmahera paradise-crow (Lycocorax pyrrhopterus)
 Obi paradise-crow (Lycocorax obiensis)

References

Lycocorax
Bird genera
Taxa named by Charles Lucien Bonaparte